Kim Môn is former district of Hải Hưng province. It was formed in 1979 from Kim Thành and Kinh Môn districts.

References 

Former districts of Vietnam